Filatima fontisella is a moth of the family Gelechiidae. It is found in Russia.

References

Moths described in 1989
Filatima